Diane Elizabeth Deans  is a former member of Ottawa City Council, Canada, representing Gloucester-Southgate Ward in the city's southeast, representing more than 49,500 residents.

Career
A graduate of the University of Guelph, she was active in the Canadian Federation of Students before becoming a staffer on Parliament Hill.

Deans was first elected to Ottawa city council in 1994. Prior to Ottawa and its surrounding municipalities were amalgamated in 2001, she faced a tough election against George Barrett. In the 2003 Ottawa election, she handily defeated two lesser-known opponents.  After victory in the 2006 Ottawa election, Deans began her fifth term as Councillor for Gloucester-Southgate ward. In the 2010 election, Deans was re-elected in her Gloucester-Southgate Ward. She was once again re-elected in 2014 for her seventh consecutive term.

Deans considers herself a centrist member of council but traditionally takes a liberal stance on most issues. In the mid-2000s, Deans' main concern had been the creation of a new branch for the Ottawa Public Library in her rapidly growing ward, now called the Greenboro Library. She also supported by-laws limiting smoking in the city, while not supporting a lawn pesticide bylaw in 2002 and 2005.

Deans is the Chairperson of the City's Community and Protective Services Committee of the City of Ottawa. She also sits on the Transportation Committee, the Finance and Economic Development Committee, Member Services Committee, and the Ottawa Community Lands Development Corporation. She is currently co-chair of the Seniors' Roundtable.

Deans sought the federal Liberal nomination in the riding of Ottawa South in 2004.  She lost to David McGuinty. She was seen as a possible candidate to challenge Chiarelli for the mayoralty in 2006, but chose to run for re-election in Gloucester-Southgate Ward.

In March 2007, Diane Deans announced that she had been approached by members of the Ontario Liberal Party urging her to seek the party's nomination for the riding of Ottawa Centre.  She received the support of the sitting MPP Richard Patten. On June 4, 2007, she lost the provincial nomination to Yasir Naqvi.

Personal life
Deans was married to former New Democratic Party Member of Parliament Ian Deans for 22 years.

In September 2019, Deans was diagnosed with ovarian cancer.

References

External links
Diane Deans website
City biography
Pesticide Vote

Ottawa city councillors
Living people
1958 births
University of Guelph alumni
Women municipal councillors in Canada
Women in Ontario politics